Cherrapunji or Sohra is a subdivisional town  (Proposed District) East Khasi Hills district in the Indian state of Meghalaya. It is the traditional capital of ka hima Sohra (Khasi tribal kingdom).

Sohra has often been credited as being the wettest place on Earth, but for now nearby Mawsynram currently holds that distinction.

History 
The history of the Khasi people – native inhabitants of Sohra– may be traced from the early part of the 16th century. Between the 16th and 18th centuries, these people were ruled by their tribal 'Syiems (rajas or chiefs) of Khyriem' in the Khasi Hills. The Khasi hills came under British authority in 1833 with the submission of the last of the important Syiem, Tirot Sing Syiem.

The main pivot on which the entire superstructure of Khasi society rests is the matrilineal system.

The original name for this town was Sohra (soh-ra), which was pronounced "Cherra" by the British. This name eventually evolved into a temporary name, Cherrapunji, meaning 'land of oranges', which was first used by tourists from other parts of India. It has again been renamed to its original form, Sohra.

Despite abundant rainfall, Sohra faces an acute water shortage and the inhabitants often have to trek very long distances to obtain potable water. Irrigation is hampered due to excessive rain washing away the topsoil as a result of human encroachment into the forests. Recent developments of rain-water harvesting techniques in the area have greatly helped the town and its neighbouring villages.

There is a monument to David Scott (British Administrator in NE India, 1802–31) in the town's cemetery.

Geography 

The plateau rises 660 meters above the surrounding valleys.

Soils on the plateau are poor owing to deforestation and washout caused by heavy rainfall. Owing to winter droughts, the vegetation in this location is even xerophytic in spite of the town's fame as an extremely wet place. Additional pressure on local ecosystems is created by the rapid increase of the population – from a Sohra-area population of 7,000 in 1960, it grew to over 10,000 by 2000.

The valleys around Sohra, however, are covered with lush and very diverse vegetation, containing numerous endemic species of plants, including Meghalaya subtropical forests.

There are some interesting living root bridges in villages near Sohra like the Umshiang root bridge, Mawsaw root bridge, Ritymmen root bridge and the Double Decker woot bridge at Nongriat village.

The Shillong Plateau is an uplifted horst-like feature, bounded by the E-W Main Boundary Thrust (MBT) to the North, the N–S Jamuna fault in the west, and the NW-SE kopilli fracture zone in the east.

Climate

Sohra has a mild  subtropical highland climate (Köppen Cwb), with monsoonal influences typical of India. Although Sohra has very wet, warm summers, it has dry, mild winters. Sohra receives both the southwest and northeast monsoonal winds, giving it a single monsoon season. It lies on the windward side of the Khasi Hills, so the resulting orographic lift enhances precipitation. In the winter months it receives the northeast monsoon showers that travel down the Brahmaputra valley. The driest months are November, December, January and February.

Sohra holds two Guinness world records for receiving the maximum amount of rainfall in a single year:  of rainfall between August 1860 and July 1861 and for receiving the maximum amount of rainfall in a single month:  in July 1861.

Causes of high rainfall

Sohra receives rains from the Bay of Bengal arm of the Indian summer monsoon. The monsoon clouds fly unhindered over the plains of Bangladesh for about 400 km. Thereafter, they hit the Khasi Hills which rise abruptly from the plains to a height of about 1,370 m above mean sea level within 2 to 5 km. The geography of the hills with many deep valley channels encompassing the low-flying (150–300 m) moisture-laden clouds from a wide area converges over Sohra. The winds push the rain clouds through these gorges and up the steep slopes. The rapid ascent of the clouds into the upper atmosphere hastens the cooling and helps vapours to condense. Most of the rain is the result of air being lifted as a large body of water vapour. The extreme amount of rainfall is perhaps the best-known feature of orographic rain in northeastern India.

Occasionally, cloudbursts can occur in one part of Sohra while other areas may be totally or relatively dry, reflecting the high spatial variability of the rainfall. Atmospheric humidity is extremely high during the peak monsoon period.

The major part of the rainfall at Sohra can be attributed to the orographic features. When the clouds are blown over the hills from the south, they are funneled through the valley. The clouds strike Sohra perpendicularly and the low flying clouds are pushed up the steep slopes. It is not surprising to find that the heaviest rainfalls occur when the winds blow directly on the Khasi Hills.

A notable feature of monsoon rain at Sohra is that most of it falls in the morning. This could be partly due to two air masses coming together. During the monsoon months, the prevailing winds along the Brahmaputra valley generally blow from the east or the northeast, but the winds over Meghalaya are from the south. These two winds systems usually come together in the vicinity of the Khasi Hills. Apparently, the winds that are trapped in the valley at night begin their upward ascent only after they are warmed during the day. This partially explains the frequency of morning rainfall. Apart from orographic features, atmospheric convection plays an important role during the monsoon and the period just preceding it.

Demographics
As of the 2011 Census in India, Sohra had a population of 10,086, with males 48.75% of the total population and females 51.25%. It has an average literacy rate of 74%, equal to the national average of 74.5%, with a male literacy rate of 72.4% and a female one of 73.9%.

Most of the people in the town overwhelmingly follow Christianity, with significant followers of indigenous Niam Khasi, Hinduism and a very small Muslim population.

Culture

The locals living in and around Sohra are known as Khasis. It is a matrilineal culture. After the wedding, the youngest girl husband should be stay with her family who own the property of the family, while others live on their own getting a bit of the share. The children take on the surname of the mother.

Sohra is also famous for its living bridges. Over hundreds of years the people have developed techniques for growing roots of trees into large bridges. The process takes 10 to 15 years and the bridges typically last hundreds of years, the oldest ones in use being over 500 years old.

Education
Sohra Government College is the only general degree college in the town. Most students move to the state capital for college degrees. Schools, like the Ramkrishna Mission which are independent and government-run schools like the Thomas Jones School have been set up in and around the town.

Media
Sohra has an All India Radio relay station known as Akashvani Sohra. It broadcasts on FM frequencies.

See also 

 Wettest places on Earth
 Lloró
 Big Bog, Maui
 Quibdó
 Villa Puerto Edén
 Tourism in Northeast India

References

Sources and external links

 cherrapunjee.com
 Interactive Film Documentary by Geox - Testing A New Waterproof Shoe In The Rainiest Place On Earth
 'For a Rainy Day', The Indian Express, 20 April 2008, by Arjun Razdan

East Khasi Hills district
Cities and towns in East Khasi Hills district
Weather extremes of Earth
Geography of Meghalaya